Michał Kazimierz Pac (1624 – 4 April 1682 in Vokė near Vilnius) of the Gozdawa Coat of Arms, was a Polish-Lithuanian  nobleman and a member of the Pac family. He was a son of Piotr Pac (c. 1570-19 July 1640, Lithuanian Court Treasurer 1635-42, Voivode of Trakai 1640-42); and a cousin of Krzysztof Zygmunt Pac, the Chancellor of Lithuania.

Biography

Michał Kazimierz Pac joined the army as a young man and steadily rose through its ranks. In 1663, during the Second Northern War (Deluge), when the territory of the Polish–Lithuanian Commonwealth was occupied by Russian and Swedish soldiers, Pac was appointed as the Field Hetman of Lithuania and voivode of Smolensk. He was further promoted to Great Hetman in 1667 and voivode of Vilnius in 1669. Pac opposed election of Michael Korybut Wiśniowiecki (ruled 1669–1673) to the throne of the Commonwealth. In 1673, Pac fought in the Battle of Khotyn against the Turks. After the death of Wiśniowiecki, he opposed election of John III Sobieski (ruled 1674–1696). When it was discovered that Pac plotted with Austria and Brandenburg against Sobieski, he fell from public favor.

Michał Kazimierz Pac funded the construction of St. Peter and St. Paul Church in Vilnius, considered to be one of the best examples of Baroque architecture in Europe. Following his wishes, he was interred in the church vestibule and his grave was marked with a Latin inscription Hic iacet pecator (English: Here lies a sinner).

Gallery

References

External links
 Pacowie: materyjały historyczno-genealogiczne / ułożone i wydane przez Józefa Wolffa, 1885, s. 123–137

1624 births
1682 deaths
Military personnel from Vilnius
Michal Kazimierz
Polish nobility
Field Hetmans of the Grand Duchy of Lithuania
Great Hetmans of the Grand Duchy of Lithuania
Polish people of the Russo-Polish War (1654–1667)
Court Marshals of the Grand Duchy of Lithuania
Voivode of Vilnius
Voivodes of Smolensk
17th-century Lithuanian people